Sun Dongmei (born September 6, 1983 in Anhui) is a female Chinese freestyle wrestler who competed at the 2004 Summer Olympics.

She finished sixth in the 55 kg freestyle competition.

External links
profile

1983 births
Living people
Chinese female sport wrestlers
Olympic wrestlers of China
Sportspeople from Anhui
Wrestlers at the 2004 Summer Olympics
Wrestlers at the 2002 Asian Games
Asian Games competitors for China
21st-century Chinese women